Portrait of Fray Hortensio Félix Paravicino is a 1609 oil on canvas painting by El Greco, now in the Museum of Fine Arts, Boston. It shows Hortensio Félix Paravicino, a monk of the Trinitarian Order and major Spanish poet who was also a close friend of the painter. He is shown in the Trinitarian habit.

Bibliography 
  ÁLVAREZ LOPERA, José, El Greco, Madrid, Arlanza, 2005, Biblioteca «Descubrir el Arte», (colección «Grandes maestros»). .
  SCHOLZ-HÄNSEL, Michael, El Greco, Colonia, Taschen, 2003. .

External links 
 Catalogue entry
  ArteHistoria.com. «Fray Hortensio Félix Paravicino» [Consulta: 03.01.2011].

Paravacino
1609 paintings
Paravacino
Paravacino
Paintings in the collection of the Museum of Fine Arts, Boston
Books in art